Coláiste Bhaile Chláir is an Irish co-educational, multidenominational community college situated in Lakeview, Claregalway, County Galway. It is under the patronage of the Galway and Roscommon Education and Training Board (GRETB).

It is a Microsoft "showcase school", having been recognised by the company as a "global leader in successful integrations of technology with teaching and learning".

History and development
Coláiste Bhaile Chláir was founded on 2 September 2013.

Alan Mongey is the principal of the school, a former president of the National Association of Principals and Deputy Principals (NAPD). Cyril Donnellan is the deputy principal, a former hurler with the Galway senior team.

Construction work began in early 2016 on a 23-classroom extension to Coláiste Bhaile Chláir. In July 2018, further plans to extend the school and also provide a purpose-built Educate Together national school in the area received the green light from An Bord Pleanála. In late 2018, the €5.4 million extension project to develop a new two storey extension to Coláiste Bhaile Chláir, including a two classroom special needs unit and sports hall, began. It was completed in July 2020.

Curriculum
The school offers both the Junior and Leaving Certificate cycles and a Transition Year cycle. Coláiste Bhaile Chláir offers all the mandatory subjects, along with woodwork, metalwork, home economics, technical graphics, business studies, design & communication, music and modern foreign languages.

Coláiste Bhaile Chláir is involved in a variety of sports, including Gaelic football, camogie, hurling, soccer, basketball, badminton and golf.

Notable staff
Cyril Donnellan – the former hurler with the Galway senior team is the current deputy principal
Damien Comer –  the Galway Gaelic footballer teaches science and maths
Paul Conroy – the Galway Gaelic footballer teaches Irish and business
Fiontán Ó Curraoin –  Galway Gaelic footballer
Maurice Sheridan – former Galway Gaelic footballer
James Regan – hurler with the Galway senior team since 2011
Lorraine Ryan – 2013 All-Ireland winning Galway camogie captain

References

External links
Coláiste Bhaile Chláir - Official website

Secondary schools in the Republic of Ireland
Secondary schools in County Galway
Educational institutions established in 2013
2013 establishments in Ireland